Śluza may refer to the following places:
Śluza, Chojnice County in Pomeranian Voivodeship (north Poland)
Śluza, Kościerzyna County in Pomeranian Voivodeship (north Poland)
Śluza, Warmian-Masurian Voivodeship (north Poland)